Philiscus of Thessaly (2nd-3rd century) was a Roman era sophist, who according to Philostratus, joined 'geometricians and philosophers' associated with Julia Domna (Empress and wife of Roman Emperor Septimius Severus)

References

3rd-century Greek people
3rd-century philosophers
Roman-era Sophists
Roman-era Macedonians
Ancient Thessalians